Eden Roc (1999) is a music album by the Italian pianist Ludovico Einaudi. "Eden Roc" is the name of a number of localities and hotels around the world.

This album features strings by the Quartetto David and guest musician Djivan Gasparyan on duduk.

Track listing

References

External links
 Ludovico Einaudi's Official website

1999 classical albums
Ludovico Einaudi albums
Instrumental albums